The Þór Akureyri men's basketball team, commonly known as Þór Akureyri, is the men's basketball department of Þór Akureyri multi sports club, based in the town of Akureyri in Iceland.

Season by season

Notes1 2020 playoffs canceled due to the Coronavirus pandemic in Iceland.

Trophies and awards

Trophies
 1. deild karla (6):
1967, 1977, 1994, 2005, 2007, 2011, 2016, 2019

 2. deild karla (2):
1982, 2003

Awards
Úrvalsdeild Men's Domestic All-First Team
Óðinn Ásgeirsson – 2001, 2002

Notable players

Notable coaches

References

External links
Official Website  
Eurobasket team profile
KKÍ: Þór Akureyri – kki.is  

Basketball teams in Iceland
Basketball teams established in 1966